Dick Ross is an American former Negro league outfielder who played in the 1920s.

Ross made his Negro leagues debut with the St. Louis Stars in 1925 and played with the Stars again the following season. In 22 recorded games with St. Louis, he batted .318 with one home run.

References

External links
 and Seamheads

Year of birth missing
Place of birth missing
St. Louis Stars (baseball) players
Baseball outfielders